Beohari is a major town and a nagar panchayat in Shahdol district in the state of Madhya Pradesh, India. Its geographical coordinates are 24° 3' 0" North, 81° 23' 0" East.

Beohari is rich in mineral resources, including marble, iron ore, clay, sand and unexplored petroleum products. Beohari is economically rich and is politically active since Independence.

History

The name "Beohari" stems from the title-prefix "Beohar", which signifies that the town was founded by a member of the Beohar dynasty. The Beohars were Rani Durgavati's prime ministers and knight-commanders, and Jagirdars of Jabalpur and their descendants continue to live there. The most notable of the Beohars is Sardar-Beohar Adhar Simha, who represented the Gond kingdom in Emperor Akbar's court, and the last Jagirdar of Jabalpur was Beohar Raghuvir Sinha. Different members of the Beohar lineage founded different settlements called Beohari, which are scattered in the Mahakoshal region of Madhya Pradesh.

Geography
It has an average elevation of 338 metres (1,108 feet).

Demographics
 the India census, Beohari had a population of 20,013. Males constituted 53% of the population and females 47%. Beohari has an average literacy rate of 64%, higher than the national average of 59.5%; with 60% of the males and 40% of females literate. 15% of the population is under nine years of age.

Notable people

Ram Kishore Shukla was a political and ideological leader of the region during the Indian independence movement and for more than half of a century (1951–2003). He represented Beohari as an M.L.A for seven terms.

Kunwar Lavkesh Singh was the Bhartiya Janta Party M.L.A from 1990 to 2008. He was also Parliamentary Secretary, State Minister and State Minister With Independent Charge.

Agriculture

Agriculture is the chief economic occupation in Beohari. In recent years, mustard farming has become one of the most harvested crop in Beohari due to balanced temperatures and the soil, which is loose, friable and deep.

The main crops are paddy; cereals like maize, sorghum, kodo-kutki and other small millets; pulses like tuar and udhad; and oil seeds like til, groundnut, soya-bean and sunflower.

Most of the region's population is dependent on agriculture. Mainly the tribals are marginal farmers who prefer the cultivation in the old traditional method.

Being a mountainous area, only 9% of the total crop gets irrigation. The area irrigated by canals, tubewells, dugwells and tanks. Some part of the place are in the shore of the Banas River and Jhapar River. In this area was mainly production of wheat and rice in India. In Beohari the highest number of growing wheat. A dam was built in this area in 2001.

Forestry

Sal, amla, teak, sarai and shisham are the main trees found in this area. The flowera of mahua and guli provide edible oil.

Education

Beohari town has an Arts and Commerce college named after Ram Kishore Shukla. About 95% of the local villages have primary schools. The region has 219 primary schools, 68 junior High schools, 13 High schools and 20 Higher secondary schools.

Connectivity

Road transport
Beohari is connected by road to Rewa, Satna, Shahdol, Sidhi and Umaria.Bus services are available from Katni to Beohari via Manpur. The bus journey from Shahdol and rewa  will take around 2 to 3 hours and from katni it will take around 5 to 6 hours.

Railways

There are direct connections to major cities. Beohari is an important station on the Katni to Howrah route, which is 112 km from Katni and 149 km apart from Singrauli. Major services are:
 Shaktipunj Express
 Jabalpur - Singrauli InterCity Express
 Katni Chopan Mix Passenger
 Bhopal - Howrah Express.
 Ajmer - Kolkata Express.
 Katni Chopan Fast Passenger.
 Singrauli Bhopal SF Express.
 Singrauli Hazrat Nizamuddin SF Express.

Air transport
Beohari is well-connected with Jabalpur Airport. Daily trains and buses are available. The nearest airport to Beohari is Jabalpur.
One can take flights from Delhi for Jabalpur and use the connecting bus or train service directly from Jabalpur (Shaktipunj Express.
Flights available for Jabalpur are on Air India, Indigo Airlines and Alliance Air airlines.

Gallery

See also
Beohari Vidhan Sabha constituency

References

statistics from www.mp.gov.in
info. from shahdol.nic.in
 http://www.mp.gov.in/highereducation/gdcbyohari/

1957: Ram Kishore Shukla, 
1962: Ram Kishore Shukla, 
1967: Ram Kishore Shukla, 
1972: Ramgopal Gupta, 
1977: Baijnath Singh, 
1980: Ram Kishore Shukla, 
1985: Ram Kishore Shukla, 
1990: Lavkesh Singh, 
1993: Ram Kishore Shukla, 
1998: Lavkesh Singh, 
2003: Lavkesh Singh,
2008-09: Bali Singh Maravi,
2014: Ram Pal Singh  
2014 vidhanabha election  congress won this seat  .
In 2015 the janpad panchayat election  was continue........

 
Shahdol
Cities and towns in Shahdol district